Bond 303 is a 1985 Hindi-language spy film, produced by B.C. Devra on B.C. Devra Films and directed by Ravi Tandon. It stars Jeetendra, Parveen Babi and music composed by R. D. Burman.

Plot
The film begins on a terrorist organization chaired by Tiger a person always in dark and moves his pawns through his internal command, Shakti Verma. Shakti establishes his base camp which creates wreaks havoc in the country. During that mayhem, a patriot KK Verma confronts the incompetence of the government in his newspaper. Hence, the case is handed over to a smart, clever & stout-hearted secret agent, Bond 303 Ajay. Immediately, he takes the charge and becomes die-hard toward the vipers. In that process, Prof. Ranjeet a renowned atomic scientist is recognized as a defector and eliminated by 303. In tandem, Ajay falls for a beau Kavitha niece of KK Verma.

Here, Ajay discovers the nefarious shade of KK Verma as Tiger, and Shakti as his son. He also learns about their conspiracy to destroy the all-eminent scientists and politicians at a summit on 13 February under an Operation Destruction. At present, the Tiger is highly charged due to the absence of Prof. Ranjeet to accomplish his mission. So, he heirs 4 renegade scientists but 303 break their plan by apprehending them. Then, Tiger plots by transposing Kavitha with her twin sister Suziana a plucky gangster, and retrieves the scientists. Being cognizant of it, Ajay makes Suziana realize her mistake and with her aid, he lands at the surface camp. At last, Bond 303 lion-heartedly ceases the baddies and tears down their operation, when, Suziana sacrifices her life. Finally, the movie ends on a happy note with the marriage of Ajay & Kavitha.

Cast
 Jeetendra as Ajay / Bond 303
 Parveen Babi as Kavita Verma / Suziana (Dual Role)
 Prem Chopra as Shakti Verma
 Deven Verma as Aslam
 Helen as Lily
 Tom Alter as Tom
 Iftekhar as Police Commissioner
 Satyendra Kapoor as Dr. Ranjit
 Dev Kumar as Moses
 Shreeram Lagoo as K. K. Verma
 Piloo Wadia as Mrs. Pinto, health spa owner
 Meenakshi Shirodkar as Salma
 Vikas Anand as Vikas
 Shammi as Suziana's mom
 Yusuf Khan as Henchman in Italy

Soundtrack
'Ab to hoga so hone do' was quite popular song from the movie.

In the health spa scene, the 70's disco hit 'Love to love you baby's by Donna Summer plays in the background. Gulshan Bawra wrote all the songs.

References

External links

1985 films
1980s Hindi-language films
Films scored by R. D. Burman
Indian spy action films